Chryse was a town of ancient Aeolis in western Asia Minor, mentioned by Pliny as no longer existing in his time.

The site of Chryse is tentatively located at Mağara Tepe, near Akçay.

References

Populated places in ancient Aeolis
Former populated places in Turkey
History of Balıkesir Province